Ernő Kolczonay (15 May 1953 – 3 October 2009) was a Hungarian épée fencer, who won two Olympic silver medals in the Épée competitions. He was a member of the Hungarian fencing team that won the world championship in Hamburg, 1978. He was runner-up in the 1979 world championship (Melbourne) and the 1982 European Championship (Mödling).

He was the fencer of the Hungarian club Budapesti Honved where he reached his most outstanding results. Later, he became a coach and he also worked for the Greece national team for several years.

At the start of the 1990s, he founded his own club named Fless Vívósikola és Sportklub. He became a successful coach and he dedicated his life to train, especially children and young people. While he remained active competitor as well, the young fencers of Fless became successful.

In his later years, Kolczonay suffered from liver disease, and died on October 3, 2009.

References

1953 births
2009 deaths
Hungarian male épée fencers
Fencers at the 1980 Summer Olympics
Fencers at the 1988 Summer Olympics
Fencers at the 1992 Summer Olympics
Olympic fencers of Hungary
Olympic silver medalists for Hungary
Olympic medalists in fencing
Deaths from liver disease
Medalists at the 1980 Summer Olympics
Medalists at the 1992 Summer Olympics
Universiade medalists in fencing
Universiade gold medalists for Hungary
Medalists at the 1979 Summer Universiade
Medalists at the 1981 Summer Universiade
Fencers from Budapest
20th-century Hungarian people
21st-century Hungarian people